Air Commodore Peter Langloh Donkin,  (19 June 1913 – 12 July 2000) was a New Zealand reconnaissance pilot with the Royal Air Force (RAF). He is thought to be the first western serviceman to be attacked by the Germans in the Second World War.

Citation for Distinguished Service Order, 22 February 1944:

References

New Zealand aviators
1913 births
2000 deaths
Royal Air Force personnel of World War II
Royal Air Force air commodores
New Zealand World War II pilots
New Zealand Companions of the Distinguished Service Order